An Internet café, also known as a cybercafé, is a café (or a convenience store or a fully dedicated Internet access business) that provides the use of computers with high bandwidth Internet access on the payment of a fee. Usage is generally charged by the minute or part of hour. An Internet cafe will generally also offer refreshments or other services such as phone repair. Internet cafes are often hosted within a shop or other establishment. They are located worldwide, and many people use them when traveling to access webmail and instant messaging services to keep in touch with family and friends.  Apart from travelers, in many developing countries Internet cafés are the primary form of Internet access for citizens as a shared-access model is more affordable than personal ownership of equipment and/or software. Internet cafés are a natural evolution of the traditional café. As Internet access rose many pubs, bars and cafés added terminals eroding the distinction between the Internet café and normal cafés.

Pre-internet online cafes

The early history of public access online networking sites is largely unwritten and undocumented. There are many experiments that can lay claim to being precursors to internet cafés.

In March 1988, the 'Electronic Café' was opened near Hongik University in Seoul, South Korea by Ahn Sang-soo (Professor of Hongik University) and Gum Nu-ri (Professor of Kookmin University). Two 16bit computers connected to Online service networks through telephone lines. Offline meetings were held in the café, which served as a place that connected online and offline activities.

In July 1991, the SFnet Coffeehouse Network was opened in San Francisco, United States by Wayne Gregori. Gregori installed coin-operated computer terminals in coffeehouses throughout the San Francisco Bay Area. The terminals dialed into a 32 line Bulletin Board System that offered an array of electronic services including FIDOnet mail and, in 1992, Internet mail.

Internet cafés
The concept of a café with full Internet access (and the name Cybercafé) was invented in early 1994 by Ivan Pope. Commissioned to develop an Internet event for an arts weekend at the Institute of Contemporary Arts (ICA) in London, and inspired by the SFnet terminal based cafes, Pope wrote a proposal outlining the concept of a café with Internet access. For the event Seduced and Abandoned: The Body in the Virtual World. Over the weekend of March 12–13 in the theatre at the ICA, Pope ran a Cybercafe which consisted of multiple Apple Mac computers on cafe style tables with menus of available services.

Around June 1994, The Binary Cafe, Canada's first Internet café, opened in Toronto, Ontario.

Inspired partly by the ICA event and associated with an Internet provider startup, EasyNet, in the same building, a commercial Internet café called Cyberia opened on September 1, 1994, in London, England. 

The first public, commercial American Internet café was conceived and opened by Jeff Anderson and Alan Weinkrantz in August 1994, at Infomart in Dallas, Texas, and was called The High Tech Cafe.

A bar called CompuCafé was established in Helsinki, Finland in 1994 featuring both Internet access and a robotic beer seller.

In January 1995, the CB1 Café in Cambridge installed an Internet connection. It was the longest running Internet Café in the UK, ultimately closing down in 2015.

The Scottish Bar in French-speaking Switzerland was started on June 27, 1995 by Pierre Hemmer.

In June 1995, three Internet cafés opened in the East Village neighborhood of New York City:  Internet Cafe, opened by Arthur Perley, the @Cafe, and the Heroic Sandwich.  In 1996, the Internet café Surf City opened in downtown Anchorage, Alaska.

By 2010, the rising popularity of internet-connected smartphones started having a major economic impact on internet cafes. It has been estimated that the number of internet cafes in South Korea dropped 17% from 19,000 in 2010 to 15,800 in 2012, and internet cafes in developing countries were struggling to grow.

In China, a 2011 government report stated that 130,000 internet cafes had closed down over the previous six years, due to tightening regulations, which brought the number down to 144,000. One industry consultant estimated the number had reached 136,000 in 2012.

In some locations, however, internet cafes continued to be used for reasons ranging from evading gambling regulations to building communities of language learners. As of 2021, internet cafes are still operating in South Korea for the purposes of online gaming.

Characteristics

While most Internet cafés are private businesses many have been set up to help bridge the 'digital divide', providing computer access and training to those without home access. There are also Internet kiosks, Internet access points in public places like public libraries, airport halls, sometimes just for brief use while standing.

Many hotels, resorts, and cruise ships offer Internet access for the convenience of their guests; this can take various forms, such as in-room wireless access, or a web browser that uses the in-room television set for its display (usually in this case the hotel provides a wireless keyboard on the assumption that the guest will use it from the bed), or computer(s) that guests can use, either in the lobby or in a business center. As with telephone service, in the US most mid-price hotels offer Internet access from a computer in the lobby to registered guests without charging an additional fee, while fancier hotels are more likely to charge for the use of a computer in their "business center."

For those traveling by road in North America, many truck stops have Internet kiosks, for which a typical charge is around 20 cents per minute.

Internet cafés come in a wide range of styles, reflecting their location, main clientele, and sometimes, the social agenda of the proprietors. In the early days they were important in projecting the image of the Internet as a 'cool' phenomenon.

A variation on the Internet café business model is the LAN gaming center, used for multiplayer gaming.  These cafés have several computer stations connected to a LAN. The connected computers are custom-assembled for gameplay, supporting popular multiplayer games. This is reducing the need for video arcades and arcade games, many of which are being closed down or merged into Internet cafés.  The use of Internet cafés for multiplayer gaming is particularly popular in certain areas of Asia like India, China, Taiwan, Hong Kong, South Korea and the Philippines. In some countries, since practically all LAN gaming centers also offer Internet access, the terms net cafe and LAN gaming center have become interchangeable. Again, this shared-access model is more affordable than personal ownership of equipment and/or software, especially since games often require high end and expensive PCs.

In Asia, gaming is very popular at the Internet cafés. This popularity has helped create a strong demand and a sustainable revenue model for most Internet cafés. With growing popularity, there also comes with this a responsibility as well. In fighting for competitive market share, the Internet cafés have started charging less and hence are adopting alternate means to maximize revenue. This includes selling food, beverages, game and telephone cards to its patrons.

Legal issues

In 2003 the EasyInternetcafé chain was found liable for copyright infringement occurring when customers used its CD-burning service to burn illegally downloaded music to their own CDs.

In 2005 Italy began requiring entities such as Internet cafés to collect photocopies of the passports of Internet, phone, or fax-using customers as a result of anti-terrorism legislation passed in July of that year.

By 2010, a variation of the Internet café known as a "sweepstakes parlor" had become widespread in certain regions of the United States. These facilities offered entries in a contest to customers who purchase Internet usage. Sweepstakes parlors faced scrutiny by local governments, who argued that sweepstakes parlors are a form of illegal gambling. A large number of these locations faced raids by officials, while a number of states enacted laws to ban them.

There are European countries where the total number of publicly accessible terminals is also decreasing. An example of such a country is Germany. The cause of this development is a combination of complicated regulation, relatively high Internet penetration rates, the widespread use of notebooks, tablets and smartphones and the relatively high number of wireless internet hotspots. Many pubs, bars and cafés in Germany offer wireless Internet, but no terminals since the Internet café regulations do not apply if no terminal is offered. Additionally, the use of Internet cafés for multiplayer gaming is very difficult in Germany since the Internet café regulations and a second type of regulations which was originally established for video arcade centres applies to this kind of Internet cafés. It is, for example, forbidden for people under the age of 18 to enter such an Internet café, although particularly people under 18 are an important group of customers for this type of Internet café.

Venues

Australia 
Netcafe opened in St Kilda at the Deluxe Café on April 4, 1995, inspired by the Internet café phenomenon that was going on in Seattle. As Australia's first Internet café, founders included Gavin Murray, Rita Arrigo and Christopher Beaumont. Direct from London's Cyberia they were joined by Kathryn Phelps and partnerships with Adam Goudie of Standard Computers for hardware and Michael Bethune from Australia Online, Australia's first ISP for of course their Internet access. In 1995 it was delivered via a standard analogue phone line using a 9600-Baud US Robotics Modem. Cafe.on.net also opened on Rundle Street in Adelaide in 1995, with the support of Internode's Simon Hackett. The Cafe was founded by John Ruciak, and was notable because of its 100Mb ethernet connection.

Brazil 
In Brazil, the initial concept brought by Monkey Paulista was based on the business model used by Internet cafés in South Korea, since this was the first house LAN to exist in Brazil, inaugurated in São Paulo, starting its activities in 1998. The company closed in 2010. However, just a week later for reasons of bureaucracy, the company Lan Game @ The House was opened and today is the first LAN house of Brazil in activity. Today it is seen as the country as a way to test new technologies and demonstration of games and products.

Mainland China 

According to the "Survey of China Internet Café Industry" by the People's Republic of China Ministry of Culture in 2005, Mainland China had 110,000 Internet cafés, with more than 1,000,000 employees contributing 18,500,000,000 yuan to P.R. China's GDP. More than 70% of Internet café visitors are from 18 to 30 years old.  90% are male, 65% are unmarried, and 54% hold a university degree. More than 70% of visitors play computer games. 20% of China's Internet users go to Internet cafés.

Internet cafes allow individuals to go about the Internet anonymous, faster, and cheaper than at home. Large Internet cafes of major cities in China are expensive and heavily regulated by Government officials. Large Internet cafes are used by wealthy elite for business transactions and social gatherings.  The majority of Internet cafes are small privately owned cafes comprising 90% of the market. (China Tightening Control, 2003) The majority of Internet cafes are unregistered because they do not meet the requirements of government standards or they do not want to go through the lengthy process of registering. According to Hong and Huang only 200 out of 2,400 cafes are registered in Beijing. The Chinese government is cracking down on the number of unregistered Internet cafes because some users spread propaganda, slander, allow pornography, and allow underage users.  Crack downs by Chinese Government Officials banned 17,488 Internet Cafes in 2002 and another 27,000 were banned in 2003. (J. Hong, L. Huang) Internet cafes that are getting closed are being replaced with government approved businesses. These pre-approved businesses monitor patrons’ activities and help the government crackdown on offending users. (Xiao, 2003; Qiu 2003)

Milestones:
 Before 1995 – An Internet café called 3C+T appeared in Shanghai, probably the first in China. The price was 20 yuan per hour ($2.50 per hour)
 1995–1998 – China's Internet cafés proliferate. Playing unconnected games is the main purpose of café users. The average price was 15~20 yuan per hour.
 After 2002 – Heavy censorships were imposed, including real-name registration. At the end of 2004, more than 70,000 Internet cafés were closed in a nationwide campaign.
 2008 – Microsoft attempts to make Internet cafés profitable in Asia and other emerging markets. After discussions with the governments of these countries, it helps to establish safe Internet cafés.
 2011 - a Chinese government report stated that 130,000 internet cafes had been closed down, bringing the total to 144,000.

India
In India, Internet cafés used by traveling people and business are declining since the arrival of widespread mobile Internet usage. A set of other services are also offered, such as printing of documents or webpages. Operators also help computer illiterates through some government processes (as a part of e-governance in India ). Low speed of mobile Internet and these services offered by Internet cafés help its survival. In India a positive government ID is compulsory for Internet café users in most states.

In 2008, there were 180,000 cyber cafes in India but by 2017, it declined to 50,000, one of primary reasons for decline was rules of IT Act, which caused licensing issues and other restrictions.

Indonesia 

According to APWKomitel (Association of Community Internet Center), there are 5,000 Internet cafés in urban Indonesian cities in 2006 providing computer/printer/scanner rentals, training, PC gaming and Internet access/rental to people without computer or internet access. The website also contains a directory listing some of these warnet/telecenter/gamecenter in Indonesia.  In urban areas, the generic name is warnet (or warung Internet) and in rural areas the generic name is telecenter. Warnets/netcafes are usually privately owned as bottom-up initiatives, while telecenters in rural villages are typically government or donor-funded as top-down financing. Information on netcafe/warnet in Indonesia can also be found in a book titled: Connected for Development: Indonesian Case study.

Currently, no special license is required to operate an Internet café or warnet in Indonesia, except for the ordinary business license applicable to cafes or small shops. Because of hype and poor business planning, many net cafes have closed down.  Although the number of Internet cafes are growing, associations such as APWKomitel urge new Internet café owners to do a feasibility study before planning to open an Internet café, and provide a business model called multipurpose community Internet center or "MCI Center" to make the business more sustainable and competitive. Hourly usage rate varies between Rp 2500–15000 ($0,27 – 1,60)

Japan
Japan has a strong Internet cafe culture, with most serving a dual purpose as joint Internet-manga cafes. Most chains (like Media Cafe Popeye and Jiyū Kūkan) allow offer customers a variety of seating options, including normal chair, massage chair, couch, and flat mat. Customers are then typically given unlimited access to soft drinks, manga, magazines, Internet, online video games, and online pornography. Most offer food and shower services for an additional fee. In fact, many purchase "night packs" and shower/sleep in the cafes, giving rise to a phenomenon known as "net cafe refugee" or "net cafe homeless".

Kenya

Internet cafés are prevalent in the city of Mombasa, as poverty and unreliable infrastructure do not make personal Internet a viable option for many citizens. The cafés are often combined with a variety of other businesses, such as chemists, manicurists, repair shops, and convenience stores. Video gaming has become particularly profitable in Internet cafés in Kenya in recent years.

Philippines

In the Philippines, Internet cafés or better known as computer shops are found on almost every street in major cities and there is at least one in most municipalities or towns. There are also Internet cafés in coffee shops and malls. High-end restaurants and fast food chains also provide free broadband to diners,rarely some internet cafés offers to make a gadget repairs, print or xerox copy, and other services. Rates range from P10 ($0.20 per hour or less based from PC specifications) on streets, up to P100 ($2 per hour) in malls.
In some major cities with existing ordinances regulating Internet cafés (e.g. Valenzuela, Marikina, Davao, Lapu-lapu and Zamboanga), students who are below 18 years of age are prohibited from playing computer games during regular class hours. Depending on the city, regulations varies on their exact details and implementation. Such city ordinances usually also requires Internet café owners to:
 Install filtering software to block adult oriented sites
 Prohibit the sales of alcoholic drinks and cigarettes inside their establishment
 Allow open view of rented computers (i.e. no closed cubicles)
 Front wall panel is 50% transparent to allow a clear view of the interior of the establishment
 Adequate lighting both inside and outside of the establishment to allow a clear view of the interior at all times
 Sometimes install a CCTV for increased security
 loitering and undress is not allow at all times
 In some occasions, brawling and trashtalking is extremely prohibited when it comes to online game matches

Poland

The first Internet café in Poland was opened in 1996. Such establishments soon became very popular among the Polish population, especially young people, who at the time still rarely had access to computers with high-speed Internet at home. They were commonly used to play games like Icy Tower or Counter-Strike, as well as for instant messaging on the Gadu-Gadu client. Internet cafés began losing popularity after Telekomunikacja Polska launched the ADSL Neostrada service in 2001, providing home Internet access to many Poles, and most establishments were shut down by the 2010s.

Slovakia 
In Slovakia, the first Internet café was opened officially in the city of Košice on July 17, 1996, providing services such as e-mail, Gopher, News, Telnet, WWW, Talk and others to the general public.

South Korea

In South Korea, Internet cafés are called PC bangs. They are ubiquitous in South Korean cities, numbering over 20,000. PC bangs mostly cater to online game playing for the younger generation. On average and mode, use of a PC bang computer is priced at around 1,000 won per hour (about $0.88 USD).

Taiwan
Internet cafés are omnipresent in Taiwan, and especially concentrated in major cities, namely Taipei and Kaohsiung.
The Internet café is called a "網咖" (Wǎng kā) in traditional Chinese. The first character literally means "net" and the second character is the first syllable of "café."The rate is consistent at about NT$10~20 in the most part, but prominent districts, such as the Eastern District of Taipei, can charge users up to NT$35 per hour. With the growth of smartphone ownership and free Wi-Fi networks in all major public attractions, the Internet cafés now primarily cater to gamers, and some even provide food and drinks.

Vietnam
In Vietnam, almost every Internet cafés advertises itself as a game center. Many Internet cafés charge a fairly cheap fee, usually $0.2 – $0.75 an hour. Services such as food and drink are also often available.
Internet café in Vietnamese is quán net or tiệm net (quán or tiệm means store and net is Internet).

United States
Reputedly, the first kosher cybercafe was the IDT Cafe in New York City's diamond district, opened in the spring of 1997.

Internet cafés were prevalent in the 1990s but began to decline in popularity due to the expansion of home-based email and internet access points, and the later deployment of Wi-Fi and smartphones. As of 2022, LAN gaming centers can be found in metropolitan areas in the United States. Gaming centers are not as popular in the U.S. compared to East Asia. Like those in Asia, gaming centers typically offer Internet access, food, and drinks.

In popular culture
Popular movies like The Beach feature an Internet café.

See also 

 Capsule hotel
 Kiosk software
 Public computer
 Public internet booths

Notes

References
 China Tightening Control Over Internet Cafes, 2003. Reuters, June 10.
 Hong, J. and L. Huang (2006). "A split and swaying approach to building information society: The case of Internet cafes in China." Telematics and Informatics 22(4): 377-393.
 John Flinn (1991). "High-Tech Small Talk at City's cafes", The San Francisco Examiner, Front Page.
 Katherine Bishop (1992). "The Electronic Coffeehouse", New York Times.
 John Boudreau (1993). "A Cuppa and a Computer", Washington Post, Front Page.
 Marian Salzman (1995). "SFnet Leads Cyber Revolution", San Francisco Examiner.
 SFnet.org , Press Archive.
  
 
 
 Madanmohan Rao(1999), Bringing the Net to the Masses: cybercafes in Latin America
 Connected for development-Information Kiosks & Sustainability - UN ICT TaskForce Series 4 
 ITU 'Global Indicators Workshop on Community Access to ICTs' di Mexico City, 16-19 November 2004 
 Here's to the Techies Who Lunch, New York Times, August 27, 1994
 report on Yahoo's best cafes, 2004.
 Xiao, Q., 2003. China's Internet Revolution. USC Annenberg Online Journalism Review.

External links

 
 World of Internet Cafes

Types of coffeehouses and cafés
 
South Korean inventions
Coffee culture
Hotel types